John Goddard Stearns (1843 - September 17, 1917), an American architect, was the cofounder of the firm Peabody & Stearns. He was an engineer and an 1863 graduate of Harvard University's Lawrence Scientific School in Cambridge, Massachusetts. He was Associate of the American Institute of Architects and elected a Fellow in 1894.

Stearns died in Duxbury, Massachusetts.

References

19th-century American architects
Fellows of the American Institute of Architects
Harvard School of Engineering and Applied Sciences alumni
1843 births
1917 deaths